Agbagli Kossi (1935-1991)  was a Togolese sculptor, whose work was representative of the West African Vodun art tradition. He was born in Bè, a district of Lomé, and became an eminent figure among the vodou circles of Togo. He was particularly noted for his little wooden voodoo figures, painted mostly with pink lacquer, and occasionally white. He produced many examples of statuettes of twins, and children with their mothers, known as venavi.

Kossi exhibited at the Magiciens de la terre exhibition at the Centre Georges Pompidou  in Paris in 1989 and in 1991 his work was shown at an exhibition in Centro Atlántico de Arte Moderno, in Las Palmas de Gran Canaria, Spain. In 2008 his work appeared at the Mami Wata: Arts for Water Spirits in Africa and Its Diasporas showcasing at the Fowler Museum of UCLA in Los Angeles. Today, his work is represented in The Contemporary African Art Collection (CAAC).

References

Togolese sculptors
1935 births
1991 deaths
Voodoo artists
Voodoo practitioners
Carpenters
Woodcarvers
People from Lomé